The Center for UN Reform Education is an independent, non-partisan, non-profit policy research organization based in New York City. The Center was founded in 1978 following a conference on United Nations reform at Villanova University, and strives to encourage, generate and sustain discussion of various specific proposals to reform and restructure the United Nations through its website; its monographs, papers and books; and its fora and conferences.

External links
 Official Site

Non-profit organizations based in New York City